Osinovka is a rural locality (a village) in Novlenskoye Rural Settlement, Vologodsky District, Vologda Oblast, Russia. The population was 23 as of 2002.

Geography 
The distance to Vologda is 76.5 km, to Novlenskoye is 12 km. Mardasovo is the nearest rural locality.

References 

Rural localities in Vologodsky District